The S-75 (Russian: С-75; NATO reporting name SA-2 Guideline) is a Soviet-designed, high-altitude air defence system, built around a surface-to-air missile with command guidance. Following its first deployment in 1957 it became one of the most widely deployed air defence systems in history. It scored the first destruction of an enemy aircraft by a surface-to-air missile, with the shooting down of a Taiwanese Martin RB-57D Canberra over China on 7 October 1959 that was hit by a salvo of three V-750 (1D) missiles at an altitude of 20 km (65,600 ft). This success was credited to Chinese fighter aircraft at the time  to keep the S-75 program secret.

This system first gained international fame when an S-75 battery, using the newer, longer-range, higher-altitude V-750VN (13D) missile was deployed in the 1960 U-2 incident, when it shot down the U-2 of Francis Gary Powers overflying the Soviet Union on May 1, 1960. The system was also deployed in Cuba during the Cuban Missile Crisis, when it shot down another U-2 (piloted by Rudolf Anderson) overflying Cuba on October 27, 1962, almost precipitating a nuclear war. North Vietnamese forces used the S-75 extensively during the Vietnam War to successfully defend Hanoi and Haiphong against US bombing. It was produced in the People's Republic of China under the names HQ-1 (under licence) and HQ-2 (modified, named FT-2000A). Egyptian engineers produced a reverse-engineered S-75 with the name Tayir-as-Sabah.

History

Development

In the early 1950s, the United States Air Force rapidly accelerated its development of long-range jet bombers carrying nuclear weapons. The USAF program led to the deployment of Boeing B-47 Stratojet supported by aerial refueling aircraft to extend its range deep into the Soviet Union. The USAF quickly followed the B-47 with the development of the Boeing B-52 Stratofortress, which had greater range and payload than the B-47. The range, speed, and payload of these U.S. bombers posed a significant threat to the Soviet Union in the event of a war between the two countries.

Consequently, the Soviets initiated the development of improved air defence systems. Although the Soviet Air Defence Forces had large numbers of anti-aircraft artillery (AAA), including radar-directed batteries, the limitations of guns versus high-altitude jet bombers were obvious. Therefore, the Soviet Air Defence Forces began the development of missile systems to replace the World War II-vintage gun defences.

In 1953, KB-2 began the development of what became the S-75 under the direction of Pyotr Grushin. This program focused on producing a missile which could bring down a large, non-maneuvering, high-altitude aircraft. As such it did not need to be highly maneuverable, merely fast and able to resist aircraft counter-measures. For such a pioneering system, development proceeded rapidly, and testing began a few years later. In 1957, the wider public first became aware of the S-75 when the missile was shown at that year's May Day parade in Moscow.

Initial deployment
Wide-scale deployment started in 1957, with various upgrades following over the next few years. The S-75 was never meant to replace the S-25 Berkut surface-to-air missile sites around Moscow, but it did replace high-altitude anti-aircraft guns, such as the 130 mm KS-30 and 100 mm KS-19. Between mid-1958 and 1964, U.S. intelligence assets located more than 600 S-75 sites in the USSR. These sites tended to cluster around population centers, industrial complexes, and government control centers. A ring of sites was also located around likely bomber routes into the Soviet heartland. By the mid-1960s, the Soviet Union had ended the deployment of the S-75 with perhaps 1,000 operational sites.

In addition to the Soviet Union, several S-75 batteries were deployed during the 1960s in East Germany to protect Soviet forces stationed in that country. Later the system was sold to most Warsaw Pact countries and was provided to China, North Korea, and eventually, North Vietnam.

Employment

While the shooting down of Francis Gary Powers' U-2 in 1960 is the first publicized success for the S-75, the first aircraft shot down by the S-75 was a Taiwanese Martin RB-57D Canberra high-altitude reconnaissance aircraft. The aircraft was hit by a Chinese-operated S-75 site near Beijing on October 7, 1959. Over the next few years, the Taiwanese ROCAF would lose several aircraft to the S-75, both RB-57s and various drones. On May 1, 1960, Gary Powers' U-2 was shot down while flying over the testing site near Sverdlovsk. The first missile destroyed the U-2, and a further 13 were also fired, hitting a pursuing high-altitude MiG-19. The downing of the U-2 led to the U-2 Crisis of 1960. Additionally, Chinese S-75s downed five ROCAF-piloted U-2s.

During the Cuban Missile Crisis, a U-2 piloted by USAF Major Rudolf Anderson was shot down over Cuba by an S-75 in October 1962.

In 1965, North Vietnam asked for assistance against American airpower, since their own air-defence system lacked the ability to shoot down aircraft flying at high altitude. After some discussion it was agreed to supply the PAVN with the S-75. The decision was not made lightly, because it greatly increased the chances that one would fall into US hands for study. Site preparation started early in the year, and the US detected the program almost immediately on 5 April 1965.

On 24 July 1965, a USAF F-4C aircraft was shot down by an S-75. Three days later, the US responded with Operation Iron Hand to attack the other sites before they could become operational. Most of the S-75 were deployed around the Hanoi-Haiphong area and were off-limits to attack (as were local airfields) for political reasons.

On 8 September 1965, during the 1965 Indo-Pak war, an Indian S-75 Dvina was fired at an unidentified target believed to have been on a night mission above Ghaziabad near Delhi during the height of a paratrooper scare. Subsequent news reports would claim the destruction of a Pakistani C-130 west of Delhi, showing a photograph of the wreckage of the self-destructed missile as evidence of airplane wreckage. According to Indian sources, no Pakistani aircraft penetrated so deeply into Indian territory.

The missile system was used widely throughout the world, especially in the Middle East, where Egypt and Syria used them to defend against the Israeli Air Force, with the air defence net accounting for the majority of the downed Israeli aircraft. The last success seems to have occurred during the War in Abkhazia (1992–1993), when Georgian missiles shot down a Russian Sukhoi Su-27 fighter near Gudauta on March 19, 1993.

During the siege of Bihac, in the Bosnian War (1992-1995), Serb forces from Krajina fired at least three S-75 in the ground-to-ground mode at the Bosnian city of Cazin. In the Yemeni Civil War (2015-present), Houthis modified some of their S-75 into surface-to-surface ballistic missiles to attack Saudi bases with them.

War in Vietnam: Countermeasures and counter-countermeasures

Between 1964 and early 1965 the Vietnamese had nothing to threaten American pilots in the air. U.S aircraft flew at an altitude of 4−5 kilometers, and the Vietnamese anti-aircraft guns were unable to reach them. However, after an S-75 shot down a U.S. F-4 Phantom aircraft, the U.S. bombers began to descend below three kilometers, below the minimum operational height of the Dvina. This brought them within the reach of Vietnamese anti-aircraft guns.

On July 24, 1965, four U.S. Air Force McDonnell F-4C Phantoms took part in an airstrike against the Dien Bien Phu munitions storage depot and the Lang Chi munitions factory west of Hanoi. One was shot down and three damaged by SA-75s. This was the first time U.S. aircraft were attacked by SAMs.

Two days later President Johnson gave the order to attack known SA-75 positions outside the 30-mile exclusion zone. On the morning of July 27, 48 F-105s participated in the strike, Operation Spring High. The Vietnamese knew U.S. aircraft were coming, and set up many 23mm and 37mm anti-aircraft guns at the two SAM sites. These anti-aircraft guns were lethal at close range. The Vietnamese shot down six aircraft and more than half of the remaining U.S. aircraft suffered damage from ground fire. However, the Vietnamese had replaced the SAMs with white-painted bundles of bamboo. Operation Spring High had destroyed two decoy targets for the loss of six aircraft and five pilots.

Between 1965 and 1966 the US developed countermeasures to the S-75 threat. The Navy soon had the AGM-45 Shrike anti-radiation air-to-surface missile in service and mounted their first offensive strike on a site in October 1965. The Air Force fitted B-66 bombers with powerful jammers (which blinded the early warning radars) and developed smaller jamming pods for fighters (which denied range information to enemy radars). Later developments included the Wild Weasel aircraft, which were fitted with AGM-45 Shrike missile systems made to home in on the radar from the threat.

The Soviets and Vietnamese were able to adapt to some of these tactics. The USSR upgraded the radar several times to improve ECM resistance. They also introduced a passive guidance mode, whereby the tracking radar could lock onto the jamming signal itself and guide missiles directly towards the jamming source. This also meant the SAM site's tracking radar could be turned off, which prevented Shrikes from homing in on it. New tactics were developed to combat the Shrike. One of them was to point the radar to the side and then turn it off briefly. Since the Shrike was a relatively primitive anti-radiation missile, it would follow the beam away from the radar and then simply crash when it lost the signal (after the radar was turned off). SAM crews could briefly illuminate a hostile aircraft to see if the target was equipped with a Shrike. If the aircraft fired a missile, the Shrike could be neutralized with the side-pointing technique without sacrificing any S-75s. Another tactic was a "false launch" in which missile guidance signals were transmitted without a missile being launched. This could distract enemy pilots, or even occasionally cause them to drop ordnance prematurely to lighten their aircraft enough to dodge the nonexistent missile.

At the same time, evasive maneuvers were used, and intensive bombardments of identified SAM firing positions were organized. Under these conditions, camouflage and radio silence became especially important. After combat launches, an anti-aircraft missile division was to leave the area immediately, otherwise it would be destroyed by a bombing attack. Until December 1965, according to American data, eight S-75M systems were destroyed, although sometimes American aircraft bombed dummy positions equipped with decoy missiles made of bamboo. Soviet and Vietnamese calculations claimed the destruction of 31 aircraft; the Americans acknowledged the loss of 13 aircraft. According to the memoirs of Soviet advisers, on average an anti-aircraft missile unit destroyed 5-6 American aircraft before being put out of action.

Despite these advances, the US was able to come up with effective ECM packages for the B-52E and later models. When the B-52s flew large-scale raids against Hanoi and Haiphong over an eleven-day period in December 1972, 266 S-75 missiles were fired, resulting in the loss of 15 of the bombers and damage to numerous others. The ECM proved to be generally effective, but repetitive USAF flight tactics early in the bombing campaign increased the vulnerability of the bombers and the North Vietnamese missile crews adopted a practice of firing large S-75 salvos to overwhelm the planes' defensive countermeasures (see Operation Linebacker II). By the conclusion of the Linebacker II campaign, the shootdown rate of the S-75 against the B-52s was 7.52% (15 B-52s were shot down, 5 B-52s were heavily damaged for 266 missiles).

However, some of the U.S aircraft which "crashed in flight accidents" in fact were lost due to S-75 missiles. When landing at an airfield in Thailand, one B-52 that had been heavily damaged by a SAM rolled off the runway and exploded on mines installed around the airfield to protect from the guerrillas; only one crewman survived. Subsequently, this B-52 was counted as "crashed in flight accidents". According to Dana Drenkowski and Lester W. Grau, the number of U.S. aircraft confirmed by themselves as lost is uncorroborated since the U.S. figures are also suspect. If a plane was badly damaged but managed to land, the USAF did not count as a loss even if it was too damaged to fly again.

During the Vietnam war, the Soviet Union delivered 95 S-75 systems and 7,658 missiles to the Vietnamese. 6,806 missiles were launched or removed by outdating. According to the Vietnamese, the S-75 shot down 1,046 aircraft, or 31% of all downed US aircraft. By comparison, air-defense guns brought down 60% and 9% were shot down by MiG fighters. The higher rate of anti-aircraft artillery is partially caused by the fact gun units received data from the S-75 radar stations that significantly improved their effectiveness.

Replacement systems
Soviet Air Defence Forces started to replace the S-75 with the vastly superior S-300 system in the 1980s. The S-75 remains in widespread service throughout the world, with some level of operational ability in 35 countries. In the 2000s, Vietnam and Egypt are tied for the largest deployments at 280 missiles each, while North Korea has 270. The Chinese also deploy the HQ-2, an upgrade of the S-75, in relatively large numbers.

Description

Soviet doctrinal organization
The Soviet Union used a fairly standard organizational structure for S-75 units. Other countries that have employed the S-75 may have modified this structure. Typically, the S-75 is organized into a regimental structure with three subordinate battalions. The regimental headquarters will control the early-warning radars and coordinate battalion actions. The battalions will contain several batteries with their associated acquisition and targeting radars.

Site layout
This unique "flower" shape led to the sites being easily recognizable in reconnaissance photos. Typically another six missiles are stored on tractor-trailers near the center of the site.

Missile

The V-750 is a two-stage missile consisting of a solid-fuel booster and a storable liquid-fuel upper stage, which burns AK-20 (based on red fuming nitric acid) as the oxidizer and TG-02 (toxic mixture of 50-52% triethylamine and 48-50% isomeric xylidine) as the fuel. The booster fires for about 4–5 seconds and the main engine for about 22 seconds, by which time the missile is traveling at about Mach 3. The booster mounts four large, cropped-delta wing fins that have small control surfaces in their trailing edges to control roll. The upper stage has smaller cropped-deltas near the middle of the airframe, with a smaller set of control surfaces at the extreme rear and (in most models) much smaller fins on the nose.

The missiles are guided using radio control signals (sent on one of three channels) from the guidance computers at the site. The earlier S-75 models received their commands via two sets of four small antennas in front of the forward fins while the D model and later models used four much larger strip antennas running between the forward and middle fins. The guidance system at an S-75 site can handle only one target at a time, but it can direct three missiles against it. Additional missiles could be fired against the same target after one or more missiles of the first salvo had completed their run, freeing the radio channel.

The missile typically mounts a  fragmentation warhead, with proximity, contact, and command fusing. One version, the S-75AK, mounted a  nuclear warhead of an estimated 15 kiloton yield or a conventional warhead of similar weight.

Table of SA-75 / S-75 missiles

Radar

The P-12 provides early detection of incoming aircraft, which are then handed off to the acquisition Fan Song radar. The Fan Song system consists of two antennas operating on different frequencies, one providing elevation (altitude) information and the other azimuth (bearing) information. Regimental headquarters also include a Spoon Rest, as well as a Flat Face long-range C-band radar and Side Net height-finder. Information from these radars is sent from the regiment down to the battalion Spoon Rest operators to allow them to coordinate their searches. Earlier S-75 versions used a targeting radar known as Knife Rest, which was replaced in Soviet use, but can still be found in older installations.

Major variants
Upgrades to anti-aircraft missile systems typically combine improved missiles, radars, and operator consoles. Usually missile upgrades drive changes to other components to take advantage of the missile's improved performance. Therefore, when the Soviets introduced a new S-75, it was paired with an improved radar to match the missile's greater range and altitude.
 SA-75 Dvina (NATO codename SA-2) with Fan Song-A guidance radar and V-750 or V-750V missiles. Initial deployment began in 1957.
 S-75M-2 Volkhov-M (Russian  - Volkhov River) (NATO codename SA-N-2A): Naval version of the A model fitted to the Sverdlov Class cruiser Dzerzhinski. Generally considered unsuccessful and not fitted to any other ships.
 S-75 Desna (Russian  - Desna River) (NATO codename SA-2B). This version featured upgraded Fan Song-B radars with V-750VK and V-750VN missiles. This second deployment version entered service in 1959.

 S-75M Volkhov (NATO codename SA-2C). Once again, the new model featured an upgraded radar, the Fan Song-C, mated to an improved V-750M missile. The improved Volkhov was deployed in 1961.
 S-75SM (NATO codename SA-2D); Fan Song-E radar and V-750SM missiles. The V-750SM differed significantly from previous versions in having new antennas and a longer barometric nose probe. Several other differences were associated with the sustainer motor casing. Improved aircraft counter measures led to the development of the Fan Song-E with its better antennas which could cut through heavy jamming.
 S-75AK (NATO codename SA-2E): Fan Song-E radar and V-750AK missiles. Similar rocket to the V-750SM, but with a bulbous warhead section lacking the older missile's forward fins. The missile can be fitted with either a command-detonated 15 kt nuclear warhead or a  conventional HE warhead.
 S-75SM (NATO codename SA-2F): Fan Song-F radar and V-750SM missiles. After watching jamming in Vietnam and the Six-Day War render the S-75 completely ineffective, the existing systems were quickly upgraded with a new radar system designed to help ignore wide-band scintillation jamming. The command system also included a home-on-jam mode to attack aircraft carrying strobe jammers, as well as a completely optical system (of limited use) when these failed. Fs were developed starting in 1968 and deployed in the USSR later that year, while shipments to Vietnam started in late 1970.
 SA-2 FC: Latest Chinese version. It can track six targets simultaneously and is able to control 3 missiles simultaneously.
 S-75M Volga (Russian  - Volga River). Version from 1995.
 Volkhov M-2 (NATO codename SA-N-2) naval variant
 M-3 (NATO codename SA-NX-2) (missile V-800, V-760/755) experimental variant with four short wrap-around boosters forward, like the Seaslug system from the UK.

As previously mentioned, most nations with S-75s have matched parts from different versions or third-party missile systems, or they have added locally produced components. This has created a wide variety of S-75 systems which meet local needs.

 HQ-1 (Hong Qi, Red Flag): Chinese variant with additional ECCM electronics to counter the System-12 ECM aboard U-2s flown by the Republic of China Air Force Black Cat Squadron.
 HQ-2: Upgraded HQ-1 with additional ECCM capability to counter the System-13 ECM aboard U-2s flown by Republic of China Air Force Black Cat Squadron. The adoption of multifunction SJ-202 radar has eliminated the need to have multiple, single-function radars, and thus greatly improved the overall effectiveness of the HQ-2 air defence system. A target drone version is designated BA-6.
 HQ-3: Development of HQ-2 with maximum ceiling increased to 30 km, specifically targeted for high altitude and high speed spy planes like SR-71. Maximum range is 42 km and launching weight is around 1 ton, and maximum speed in 3.5 Mach. A total of 150 built before the program ended and the subsequent withdraw of HQ-3 from active service, and the knowledge gained from HQ-3 was used to develop later version of HQ-2.
 HQ-4: Further development of HQ-2 from HQ-3, with solid rocket engines, resulting in a two-thirds reduction of logistic vehicles needed for a typical SAM battalion with six launchers: from the original more than 60 vehicles for HQ-1/2/3 to just slightly over 20 vehicles for HQ-4. After 33 missiles were built (5 from batch 01, 16 from batch 02, and 12 from batch 03), the program was cancelled, but most of the technologies were continued as separate independent research programs, and these technologies were later used on later Chinese SAMs upgrades and developments such as HQ-2 and HQ-9.
 Sayyad-1: Iranian upgraded version of HQ-2 SAM differ with the Chinese versions in guidance and control subsystems. Sayyad-1 equipped with an about 200-kilogram warhead and has speed of 1,200 meters per second.
 Sayyad-2
 Sayyad-3
 Sayyad-4
 Sayyad-4B

DF-7
 DF-7/Dongfeng 7/M-7/Project 8610/CSS-8: Chinese surface-to-surface tactical ballistic missile converted from HQ-1/2/3/4. M-7 missile is the only Chinese ballistic missile that can be launched at a slant angle. The rear section of the HQ SAMs are retained, but the forward half is greatly enlarged into a shuttle shape to house bigger warhead and more fuel, while the control surfaces on the forward section are deleted. Armed with a 500 kg warhead (two and half a time of that of the original SAM version) the maximum range of M-7 is 200 km (more than four times of that of the original SAM version).

Qaher-1
The Qaher-1 (meaning "Subduer-1") is originally a Soviet S-75 missile that was developed locally by the Houthis to be a surface to surface missile that works on two stages, liquid fuel and solid fuel. It was unveiled in December 2015. The Houthis have fired many Qaher-1s into Saudi Arabia during the course of the Yemeni Civil War.

Operators

Current operators
  - 40 
  – 79 Launchers
  – 25
  – 18
  
 
  – 240, Tayer el-Sabah variant
  – Some developed into self-propelled systems
 Tigray Defense Forces
  – 300+ Launchers, HQ-2J and indigenous Sayyad-1/1A & 2.
  – few
 
 
  – 48 next 250 in 2008
  – up to 270
  – HQ-2B in service with the Pakistan Air Force.
 
  – 700
  – 275
  – few
  – 280

Former operators
  Afghanistan 
 
  – 84 launchers
  – 23
 
 
 
  - under Paskhas, Indonesian Air Force and Indonesian National Air Defense Forces Command
 
 
  – 3 launchers
 
 
 
 Most retired in 1991–1996. Missiles used as targets for training. RM-75V/MV Armavir, Sinitsa-1/6 (SAM S-75M, missile 20DSU), Sinitsa-23/Korshun (Launcher S-75M3, missile 5YA23), (all in service as of 2011)
  – not operational
 
  – passed on to successor states
  – passed on to successor states, but retired shortly afterwards

See also
 Project Devil
 Project Nike - similar US medium-high altitude anti-air missile system

References
Citations

Bibliography

External links

 Russian site on the S-75 from Said Aminov "Vestnik PVO" 
 Russian site on the S-75 from Vitaly Kuzmin "Military Paritet" 
 S-75M3 Volkhov (SA-2e Guideline) Simulator

Cold War surface-to-air missiles of the Soviet Union
Lavochkin
Nuclear anti-aircraft weapons
Science and technology in the Soviet Union
S-075
S-075
Almaz-Antey products
Military equipment introduced in the 1950s